Yankee traders is a term used historically to refer to American merchants and drug smugglers, particularly around the turn of the 19th century. Many of the Yankee traders came from Boston or other New England ports — hence the appellation "Yankee". They were reputed to be particularly shrewd and independent.

References

External links
 A Yankee Trader in Yap: Crayton Philo Holcomb

19th century in the United States
19th-century economic history
Economic history of the United States